The 2012 United States House of Representatives elections in Washington were held on Tuesday, 6 November 2012, to elect the ten U.S. representatives from the state, one from each of the state's ten congressional districts, a gain of one seat following the 2010 United States census. The elections coincided with the elections of other federal and state offices, including a quadrennial presidential election, and a U.S. Senate election. The state certified the returns on 6 December 2012. Primary elections were held on 7 August 2012.

Overview
Summary of Votes Cast in the General Election

District 1

Democrat Jay Inslee, who represented the 1st district starting in 1999, resigned 20 March 2012, to focus on his run for Governor of Washington.

Primary election

Democratic Candidates

Advanced to general
Suzan DelBene, former director at the Washington State Department of Revenue, general election candidate for the 8th district in 2010

Eliminated in primary
Darcy Burner, former manager at Microsoft and general election candidate for the 8th district in 2006 & 2008
Steve Hobbs, state senator
Darshan Rauniyar, businessman and political activist;
Laura Ruderman, former state representative

Withdrawn
Roger Goodman, state representative

Declined
Brian Baird, former U.S. Representative
Dennis Kucinich, incumbent U.S. Representative for Ohio's 10th congressional district 
Andrew Hughes, tax attorney 
Marko Liias, state representative

Republican Candidates

Advanced to general
John Koster, former state representative, member of the Snohomish County Council and general election candidate for the 2nd district in 2010

Withdrawn
Greg Anders, the executive director of the Bellingham Heritage Flight Museum
James Watkins, who unsuccessfully ran in the 1st district in 2010,

Independent Candidates

Eliminated in primary
Larry Ishmael, former member of the Issaquah School Board and Republican general election candidate for this seat in 2006 & 2008, ran as an independent candidate.

Results
Republican John Koster and Democrat Suzan DelBene received the most votes in the nonpartisan blanket primary on 7 August for both the brief period of office remaining in the old 1st district and the redistricted 1st district, and faced each other in two separate ballot positions, with different boundaries, in the special election on 6 November.

Special Election
On 20 March 2012, then Representative Jay Inslee resigned his seat in the House of Representatives to run for Governor.  A Special Election was held at the same time as the General Election for a Representative to serve out the remainder of Inslee's term in the 112th Congress. The winner of the Special Election, Suzan DelBene, assumed the seat on 13 November 2012.

Results

General Election

Endorsements

Polling

Predictions

Results
DelBene won and was sworn in to serve the remainder of Inslee's term on 13 November 2012.

District 2

Democrat Rick Larsen, who represented the 2nd district since 2001, ran for re-election.

In the December 2011 redistricting proposal, the 2nd district was made more favorable to Democrats.

Primary election

Democratic Candidates

Advanced to general
Rick Larsen, incumbent U.S. Representative

Republican Candidates

Advanced to general
Dan Matthews, Air Force veteran and pilot

Eliminated in primary
Eli Olson, electrical distribution company manager and political director for the Snohomish County Young Republicans
John C. W. Shoop, United States Marine, combat veteran and survival instructor

Declined
Greg Anders, the director of the Bellingham Heritage Flight Museum
John Koster, former state representative, member of the Snohomish County Council and general election candidate for this seat in 2010

Other Party's Candidates

Eliminated in primary
Mike Lapointe (99% Party)

Independent Candidates

Eliminated in primary
Glen S. Johnson

Results

General election

Results

District 3

Republican Jaime Herrera Beutler, who represented the 3rd district since January 2011, ran for re-election.

Primary election

Republican Candidates

Advanced to general
Jaime Herrera Beutler, incumbent U.S. Representative

Democratic Candidates

Advanced to general
Jon Haugen, commercial pilot for Delta Air Lines

Withdrawn
Elizabeth Uelmen, middle school associate principal

Declined
Tim Leavitt, Mayor of Vancouver
Steve Stuart, Clark County Commissioner

Results

General election

Predictions

Results

District 4

Republican Doc Hastings, who represented the 4th district since 1995, successfully ran for re-election.

Primary election

Republican Candidates

Advanced to general
Doc Hastings, incumbent U.S. Representative

Eliminated in primary
Jamie Wheeler, state director for FairTax.org and member of the Tri-Cities Tea Party

Democratic Candidates

Advanced to general
Mary Baechler, businesswoman

Eliminated in primary
Mohammad H. Said, doctor

Withdrawn
Jay Clough, radiological control technician and nominee for this seat in 2010

Results

General election

Results

District 5

Republican Cathy McMorris Rodgers, who represented the 5th district since 2005, ran successfully for re-election in 2012.

Primary election

Republican Candidates

Advanced to general
Cathy McMorris Rodgers, incumbent U.S. Representative

Eliminated in primary
Randall Yearout, crane operator

Democratic Candidates

Advanced to general
Rich Cowan, president and CEO of a film production company

Declined
Dan Morrissey, professor at Gonzaga University School of Law
Mary Verner, former Mayor of Spokane

Results

General election

Results

District 6

Democrat Norm Dicks, who represented the 6th district since 1977, decided to retire rather than seeking re-election.

Primary election

Democratic Candidates

Advanced to general
 Derek Kilmer, state senator

Declined
Steve Boyer, Kitsap County Sheriff 
Josh Brown, Kitsap County Commissioner 
Norman D. Dicks, incumbent U.S. Representative
James Hargrove, state Senator
Mark Lindquist, Pierce County Prosecutor 
Pat McCarthy, Pierce County Executive 
Christine Rolfes, state senator
Tim Sheldon, state senator and Mason County Commissioner
Brian Sonntag, State Auditor
Marilyn Strickland, Mayor of Tacoma
Kevin Van De Wege, state representative

Republican Candidates

Advanced to general
Bill Driscoll, businessman

Eliminated in primary
Stephan Brodhead, small business owner
Doug Cloud, attorney and general election candidate for this seat in 2004 and 2006, 2008 & 2010 
David "Ike" Eichner, accountant
Jesse Young, technology consultant and candidate for this seat in 2010

Withdrawn
Bob Sauerwein, insurance agent

Declined
Jan Angel, state representative

Results

General Election

Polling

Results

District 7

Democrat Jim McDermott, who represented the 7th district since 1989, ran for re-election.

Primary election

Democratic Candidates

Advanced to general
Jim McDermott, incumbent U.S. Representative

Eliminated in primary
Charles Allen, product manager at Amazon
Andrew Hughes, tax attorney
Don Rivers, human rights activist

Republican Candidates

Advanced to general
Ron Bemis, lawyer

Eliminated in primary
Scott Sutherland

Results

General election

Results

District 8

Republican Dave Reichert, who represented the 8th district since 2005, ran for re-election.

Primary election

Republican Candidates

Advanced to general
Dave Reichert, incumbent U.S. Representative

Eliminated in primary
Ernest Huber, retired military commander
Keith Swank, former police officer

Democratic Candidates

Advanced to general
Karen Porterfield, associate dean and public administration lecturer at Seattle University

Eliminated in primary
Keith Arnold, accounting technician

Independent Candidates

Withdrawn
James Windle, Associate Dean and Instructor at the Department of Defense's National Defense University

Results

General election

Results

District 9

Democrat Adam Smith, who represented the 9th district since 1997, was re-elected.

Primary election

Democratic Candidates

Advanced to general
Adam Smith, incumbent U.S. Representative

Eliminated in primary
Dave Christie
Tom Cramer

Republican Candidates

Advanced to general
Jim Postma, businessman and candidate for this seat in 2008 and 2010

Eliminated in primary
John Orlinski

Results

General election

Results

District 10

The newly created 10th district is centred on the state capital, Olympia, and includes portions of Thurston, Pierce, and Mason counties.

Primary election

Democratic Candidates

Advanced to general
Dennis Heck, former majority leader of the Washington House of Representatives and general election candidate for the 3rd district in 2010

Eliminated in primary
Jennifer Ferguson, nonprofit founder and small business owner

Republican Candidates

Advanced to general
Dick Muri, Pierce County councilmember and general election candidate for the 9th district in 2010

Eliminated in primary
Stan Flemming, Pierce County councilmember

Results

General election

Endorsements

Predictions

Results
Heck defeated Muri 58.6% to 41.4%.

References

External links
Elections & Voting at the Washington Secretary of State
United States House of Representatives elections in Washington, 2012 at Ballotpedia
Campaign contributions for U.S. Congressional races in Washington from OpenSecrets
Outside spending at the Sunlight Foundation
Politics at the Seattle Post-Intelligencer
Election 2012 at The Seattle Times

United States House of Representatives
2012
Washington